Mauro Javier dos Santos (born 7 July 1989), known as Mauro dos Santos, is an Argentine footballer who plays as a defender for CD El Ejido in the Segunda Federación.

Club career
Born in Santo Tomé, Mauro graduated from Banfield's youth setup, and made his professional debut on 22 June 2008, in a 2–3 away defeat against River Plate. He was handed his first start on 26 October, in a 0–0 draw at Gimnasia LP.

After more than three full seasons with Banfield, Mauro moved abroad, signing a one-year deal with Real Murcia. He made his debut for the club on 21 August 2012, against Córdoba CF. On 24 July of the following year, Mauro renewed his link with the Pimentoneros for a further year, and scored his first professional goal on 29 September, the first of a 2–1 home win against CD Numancia.

On 22 July 2014, Mauro signed a one-year deal with La Liga side UD Almería. He made his debut in the competition on 23 August, starting in a 1–1 home draw against RCD Espanyol.

Mauro scored his first goal in the Spanish top level on 21 September, netting his side's second in a 2–1 away win against Real Sociedad through a header. On 21 July 2015 he moved to fellow league team SD Eibar, after suffering relegation with the Andalusians.

On 11 July 2017, Mauro signed a two-year contract with CD Leganés, still in the top tier. On 26 December 2018, he terminated his contract with the club, and signed a two-and-a-half-year deal with CD Tenerife in the second division the following 8 January.

Rajasthan United
On 2 February 2022, it was announced that I-League club Rajasthan United signed Mauro on a season-long deal. On 8 March 2022, he made his debut for the club against Aizawl, in a 1–0 win.

CD El Ejido
In July 2022, CD El Ejido secured the services of Mauro for the upcoming season.

Career statistics

Club

References

External links

1989 births
Living people
Argentine footballers
Association football defenders
Argentine expatriate footballers
J2 League players
Argentine Primera División players
Segunda División players
La Liga players
Club Atlético Banfield footballers
Real Murcia players
UD Almería players
SD Eibar footballers
CD Leganés players
CD Tenerife players
Albirex Niigata players
Expatriate footballers in Spain
Expatriate footballers in Japan
Argentine expatriate sportspeople in Spain
Argentine expatriate sportspeople in Japan
Argentine expatriate sportspeople in India
Expatriate footballers in India
I-League players
Rajasthan United FC players
People from Santo Tomé, Corrientes
Sportspeople from Corrientes Province